Carlos Torres Ríos (1898–1956) was an Argentine cinematographer, film director, screenwriter, film editor and film producer of the classic era.

Born in Buenos Aires, he worked as a cinematographer in films beginning with Palomas rubias (1920), La Gaucha (1921) and Buenos Aires, ciudad de ensueño (1922) and films such as Adiós Buenos Aires (1938) and Al marido hay que seguirlo (1948). He later worked with his brother Leopoldo Torres Ríos in films of the 1940s and 1950s, a highly influential pair in Argentine cinema.

He had a number of credits as a director, screenwriter, editor and film producer in his own right, directing and screenwriting Bólidos de acero in 1950.

Filmography

Director

 Un hombre bueno (1941)
 La luna en el pozo (1942)
 Fuego en la montaña (1943)
 Santos Vega Returns (1947)
 Con los mismos colores (1949)
 Mary tuvo la culpa (1950)
 Bólidos de acero (1950)
 Rhythm, Salt and Pepper (1951)
 Tierra extraña (1951)
 La niña de fuego (1952)
 Somos todos inquilinos (1954)

External links
 

1898 births
1956 deaths
Argentine film directors
Male screenwriters
Argentine cinematographers
Argentine film editors
Argentine film producers
People from Buenos Aires
Date of birth missing
Date of death missing
20th-century Argentine screenwriters
20th-century Argentine male writers